The CT-Cyber Crime Investigation, former Cyber Security & Crime Division, commonly known as the Cyber Crime Unit, is a division of Counter Terrorism and Transnational Crime is operated under Dhaka Metropolitan Police of Bangladesh Police. The main function of this division is to counter terrorism in cyber space. It also patrol, prevent, detect and investigate cyber-terrorism and cyber-crime in Dhaka Metropolitan.

History 
This division commenced its operation on 3 May 2016. Amidst the rise of cyber crimes and cyber bullying in Bangladesh, the policy makers took initiative to launch this dedicated Cyber Crime Division for Dhaka Metropolitan that will address digital crimes including online harassment, hacking, Financial Fraud Crime and many more. The agency has renamed their name "Cyber Crime Investigation Division" on 10 July 2020

Organization 
Headquartered in 36 Minto Road, Ramna, Dhaka, the division works under one Deputy Commissioner of Police. He is assisted by two Additional Deputy Commissioner of Police. They supervise four teams, namely:

 Internet Referral;
 Cyber Terrorism Investigation;
 Digital Forensic and
 E-fraud Investigation.

Each of these teams are led by one Assistant Commissioner of Police. The total strength sanctioned for this division is very limited and is only 100.

Services 
The Cyber Division services by its Help Desk, over hotline number, e-mail, Hello CT apps and different social media platforms.

The Help Desk of Cyber Division is a unique innovation for instantly helping the cyber victims of Dhaka Metropolitan.

Awards 
In 2017 one of the ADC Md Najmul Islam was awarded with Bangladesh Police Medal (service).

On 12 December 2018 this Division was awarded with Digital Bangladesh Award 2018.

On Police Week 2019 DC Md Alimuzzaman was awarded with Bangladesh Police Medal (service) and ADC A F M Al Kibria, ADC Sayed Nasirullah & Ishtiaque Ahmed were awarded with President Police Medal (service).

On Police Week 2020 SP Mishuk Chakma, AC Dhruba Joetirmoya Gope and Inspector Md Rafiqul Islam was awarded with Bangladesh Police Medal (service).

Cyber Crime Investigating Agencies in Bangladesh 
Besides this division Cyber Police Center, CID; Cyber Branch, Police Bureau of Investigation and Cyber & Special Crime Division, DB, DMP are responsible to investigate cyber crime in Bangladesh.

Confusion & Controversy 
Though not the CT-Cyber Crime Investigation but Cyber & Special Crime Division, DB, DMP arrested Director Anonno Mamun and actor Shaheen Mridha over content the police deemed offensive in the movie Nabab LLB. This was criticized by Nurul Alam Atique, noted filmmaker,  as a threat to free speech and artistic freedom.

References

External links 
 Official Website
 

Police units of Bangladesh
Computer security organizations
Bangladeshi intelligence agencies
Counterterrorism in Bangladesh